The Men's 100 metre freestyle S9 swimming event at the 2004 Summer Paralympics was competed on 20 September. It was won by Matthew Cowdrey, representing .

1st round

Heat 1
20 Sept. 2004, morning session

Heat 2
20 Sept. 2004, morning session

Heat 3
20 Sept. 2004, morning session

Final round

20 Sept. 2004, evening session

References

M